Omegandra is a monotypic genus of flowering plants belonging to the family Amaranthaceae. The only species is Omegandra kanisii.

Its native range is Northern Australia.

References

Amaranthaceae
Amaranthaceae genera
Monotypic Caryophyllales genera